The 2005–06 William & Mary Tribe men's basketball team represented The College of William & Mary during the 2005–06 college basketball season. This was head coach Tony Shaver's third season at William & Mary. The Tribe competed in the Colonial Athletic Association and played their home games at Kaplan Arena. They finished the season 8–20, 3–15 in CAA play and lost in the preliminary round of the 2006 CAA men's basketball tournament to VCU. They did not participate in any post-season tournaments.

Program notes
Before the start of the season, William & Mary Hall was officially renamed Kaplan Arena at William & Mary Hall.

References

William and Mary Tribe
William & Mary Tribe men's basketball seasons
William and Mary Tribe
William and Mary Tribe